Dear Ishq is an Indian Hindi-language romantic drama web serial that premiered on 26 January 2023 and digitally streams on Disney+ Hotstar. Produced by Yash A Patnaik and Mamta Patnaik under the banner Beyond Dreams Entertainment and Inspire Films, it stars Sehban Azim and Niyati Fatnani.

Premise
Abhimanyu is a noted romantic fiction writer with a huge female fan following. He is moody, arrogant and rude with his remarks. He gets into an argument with Asmita Roy who is a literary editor, sharing different ideologies about love and fiction. How these two loggerheads fall into love forms the rest of the story!

Cast

Main
 Niyati Fatnani as Asmita Roy
 Sehban Azim as Abhimanyu Razdan

Recurring
 Kishwer Merchant as Maya Costa
 Puneet Tejwani as Peter Costa
 Kunal Verma as Rizwan Khan
 Buneet Kapoor as Shauvik Sen
 Tanya Nisha Sharma as Shalini Vats
 Sanjeev Seth as Raman Razdan
 Roma Bali as Nita Razdan
 Jyoti B Mukherji as Sharmila Roy
 Beena Banerjee as Charulata Roy
 Sugandh Dhindaw as Bani Kapoor
 Shamikh Abbas as Bijoy Roy
 Kaveri Ghosh as Bindoo Sen
 Preetesh Manas as Anirban Das
 Sandeep Soni as Nannu, Abhimanyu's servant
 Viyanna Dadwani as Pia Costa
 Simran Rawal as Arya
 Gagan Deep as Dev
 Priya Shukla as Receptionist
 Shiv Pathak as Peon
 Kalpesh Rajgor as Cafe Owner
 Brijesh Mourya as Waiter

Production
The series was announced on Disney+ Hotstar by Beyond Dreams Entertainment. It is based on Ravinder Singh's Write Me A Love Story (2021). Sehban Azim and Niyati Fatnani were signed as the lead. The promo featuring the leads was released on 17 January 2023.

Reception

Critical reception
OTT Play reviewing the first episodes, "the show was sharply criticized for being cliched, lack of focus, and questionable camera shots. They felt it was more in line with a typical Hindi television show than a web series."

See also
 List of Disney+ Hotstar original programming

References

External links
 Dear Ishq on Disney+ Hotstar
 

2023 Indian television series debuts
2020s Indian television series
Hindi-language television shows
Indian television soap operas
Disney+ Hotstar original programming
Television shows based on Indian novels